Baron  was an admiral in the early Imperial Japanese Navy.

Biography
Tōgō was born to a samurai family of Fukui Domain.  He was sent by the domain to the predecessor of the Imperial Japanese Army Academy when it was still located in Osaka, but left without graduating, and then entered the fourth class of the Imperial Japanese Naval Academy located in Tsukiji, Tokyo and was commissioned into the Imperial Japanese Navy.

He was promoted to lieutenant in 1885 and lieutenant commander in 1890. He later served on the staff of the Readiness Fleet. Tōgō was then executive officer on the cruiser , ironclad Kongō, and cruiser  before receiving his first command, the training ship Manju, in 1893.

During the First Sino-Japanese War, Tōgō was captain of the gunboat . After a stint at the Naval Staff College, he commanded the cruisers Yaeyama and Saien.

In 1897, Tōgō was appointed chief of staff of Kure Naval District and in 1899 oversaw the completion of the new armored cruiser  at AG Vulcan Stettin in Germany and her first voyage to Japan. In 1902, he was promoted to rear admiral and served as commandant of the Imperial Japanese Naval Academy.
 
Immediately before the start of the Russo-Japanese War, Tōgō was appointed commander of the 6th Battle Division of the IJN 3rd Fleet, which consisted of four cruisers led by his flagship, . He fought at the Battle of the Yellow Sea and the Battle of Tsushima. In November 1905, after the end of the war, he was promoted to vice admiral and commander of the IJN 4th Fleet; however, he died only two months later. He was promoted to baron (danshaku) under the kazoku  peerage posthumously. His grave is at Aoyama Cemetery in Tokyo.

References

External links

Notes

1852 births
1906 deaths
People from Fukui (city)
Military personnel from Fukui Prefecture
Imperial Japanese Navy admirals
Kazoku
Japanese military personnel of the First Sino-Japanese War
Japanese military personnel of the Russo-Japanese War